The 1882 season was the first season for the brand new Philadelphia Athletics (no relation, except by name, to the previous Philadelphia Athletics team). They finished with a 41–34 record and a third-place position in the brand new American Association league.

Regular season

Season standings

Record vs. opponents

Opening Day lineup

Roster

Player stats

Batting

Starters by position
Note: Pos = Position; G = Games played; AB = At bats; H = Hits; Avg. = Batting average; HR = Home runs; RBI = Runs batted in

Other batters
Note: G = Games played; AB = At bats; H = Hits; Avg. = Batting average; HR = Home runs; RBI = Runs batted in

Pitching

Starting pitchers
Note: G = Games pitched; IP = Innings pitched; W = Wins; L = Losses; ERA = Earned run average; SO = Strikeouts

Relief pitchers
Note: G = Games pitched; W = Wins; L = Losses; SV = Saves; ERA = Earned run average; SO = Strikeouts

Notes

References
 1882 Philadelphia Athletics team page at Baseball Reference

Philadelphia Athletics (AA) seasons
Philadelphia Athletics season
Philly